The Bismarck Cathedral Area Historic District, also known as The Hill, is a historic district that is listed on the National Register of Historic Places (NRHP). A first  area was NRHP-listed in 1980. The original listing included 47 contributing buildings, including the Cathedral of the Holy Spirit. The district was further changed in 2010 by subtraction of some buildings and properties, and by the addition of others.

References

Colonial Revival architecture in North Dakota
Tudor Revival architecture in North Dakota
Historic districts on the National Register of Historic Places in North Dakota
National Register of Historic Places in Bismarck, North Dakota